Ullmann v. United States, 350 U.S. 422 (1956), was a United States Supreme Court case in which the court held that a person given immunity from prosecution loses their Fifth Amendment right against self-incrimination, thus upholding the Constitutionality of the Immunity Act of 1954.

The Court stated, “This command of the Fifth Amendment (‘nor shall any person . . . be compelled in any criminal case to be a witness against himself. . . .’) registers an important advance in the development of our liberty — ‘one of the great landmarks in man's struggle to make himself civilized.’”

References

External links
 

United States Supreme Court cases
United States Supreme Court cases of the Warren Court
1956 in United States case law